Viktor Smirnov (September 9, 1968, Kineshma, Ivanovo Oblast) is a Russian political figure, deputy of the 8th State Dumas. 

Smirnov started his political career in 1993 when he was elected deputy of the municipal committee of the city of Zavolzhsk. Later he continued working as the head of the Department of Education of the Administration of Kokhma. From 2002 to 2003, Smirnov was a docent at the Department of Constitutional Law and General Theoretical Legal Disciplines of the Ivanovo Branch of the International Institute of Management. He left the post to start working at the election commission of the Ivanovo Oblast. In 2005-2012, Smirnov worked as the chairman of the regional electoral committee. From June 2012 to September 2013, he served as vice-governor of the Ivanovo Oblast. Due to the election to the Ivanovo Oblast Duma of the 6th convocation, he left the post. In 2018, Smirnov became a member of the Federation Council. Since September 2021, he has served as deputy of the 8th State Duma.

References

1968 births
Living people
United Russia politicians
21st-century Russian politicians
Eighth convocation members of the State Duma (Russian Federation)
Members of the Federation Council of Russia (after 2000)